The Strength / The Sound / The Songs is the debut studio album by Danish rock band Volbeat. Released in 2005, the album initially failed to chart. However, in July 2006 the album entered the Danish Charts, peaking at number 18. The album would stay on that chart for 21 non-consecutive weeks. Volbeat's label at the time, Mascot Records, had only a limited distribution deal in the United States, meaning that the album went largely unnoticed in that country. Volbeat would not breakthrough in the United States until 2010 with their fourth album, Beyond Hell/Above Heaven.

Two of the album's songs, "Danny & Lucy (11PM)" and "Fire Song" form a story which is continued on Volbeat's second album, Rock The Rebel/Metal The Devil with the song "Mr. & Mrs. Ness", the song "Mary Ann's Place" from the band's third album, Guitar Gangsters & Cadillac Blood, and is concluded on the band's sixth album, Seal the Deal & Let's Boogie with the song "You Will Know".

The songs "Pool of Booze, Booze, Booza", "Soulweeper", "Danny & Lucy (11 PM)", and "Alienized" are all taken from Volbeat's 2003 demo, titled "Beat The Meat". Additionally, the song Soulweeper was released as a single in 2003, though the band did not have a label when it was released and is considered a demo. The only official single released from the album was the band's cover of Dusty Springfield's "I Only Wanna Be With You", which was released in 2006. The band also filmed a music video for the single, which features Volbeat performing on a rooftop.

Reception 
Being a limited release outside of Denmark, professional English reviews of the album are scarce. Scott Alisoglu of Blabbermouth.net gave the album a 7.5/10, saying "Loud guitars, a nice collection of hooks, and an endearingly oddball vocal performance make 'The Strength/The Sounds/The Songs' a worthwhile spin. It sure as hell stands apart from anything in my CD collection."

Track listing 
All songs written by Michael Poulsen, Jon Larsen, Anders Kjølholm and Franz Gottschalk, except track 13, written by Mike Hawker and Ivor Raymonde. The words of track 11 are credited to both Michael Poulsen and Elvis A. Presley.

Personnel
Volbeat
 Michael Poulsen – vocals, rhythm guitar
 Franz "Hellboss" Gottschalk – lead guitar
 Anders Kjølholm – bass
 Jon Larsen – drums

Certifications

References

Volbeat albums
2005 debut albums
Albums produced by Jacob Hansen